João Manuel Vieira Pinto  (born 19 August 1971) is a Portuguese retired professional footballer who played mostly as a forward.

Blessed with playmaking and goalscoring ability, he made his name mostly at a domestic level and as a key figure in the Portuguese national team's "Golden Generation", collecting 152 caps and scoring 47 goals all categories comprised (81/23 for the senior team alone) and representing the country in one World Cup and two European Championships.

At the club level, Pinto started his career with Boavista, but it was mainly associated with two of the biggest clubs in the country, Benfica and Sporting, with which he won one Primeira Liga each for a total of six major titles combined. Over 19 top-division seasons, he played 450 matches and netted 112 goals.

Career
As a youth, Pinto played for Bairro do Falcão (where he was born, in Campanhã, Porto's east side) and Águias da Areosa FC, and once tried to join FC Porto's youth system – refused, he moved to Boavista F.C. instead. As a child, he impressed with his speed and ball control, and was subsequently one of the brightest stars in Portugal's wins in the FIFA U-20 World Cup in Riyadh and Lisbon, being one of three players ever to have been on the winning side in this competition twice, along with goalkeeper Fernando Brassard (whom however did not play in the first tournament) and Argentinian Sergio Agüero; additionally, he made his Primeira Liga debut at only 17.

Pinto's performance in the first youth competition earned him a transfer to Atlético Madrid in 1990, but he was placed instead with the club's B-team. After a forgettable season he rejoined Boavista, played every game, scored eight goals and helped his team win the 1992 Portuguese Cup, in a final against city rivals Porto; shortly after, he signed with S.L. Benfica.

Whilst with Benfica, Pinto's career was threatened in late 1992 by a collapsed lung during an international match for Portugal in Scotland for the 1994 FIFA World Cup qualifiers– he did recover, but was unable to help the team win the title. However, in the next season, he played arguably his best football there, his best moment coming in the Lisbon derby against Sporting CP, where he scored three goals and was on the play of the remaining three in a 6–3 win at the Estádio José Alvalade; this result proved to be decisive for the club's clinching of the 1994 national championship.

Dubbed "The Golden Boy", Pinto won club captaincy from veteran António Veloso after the latter's retirement in 1995, but was unable to win a national title again. Arguably, the lack of quality of a poorly managed Benfica side played a part in his lack of development after 1995, as he was considered as the main talent of the Portugal squad alongside playmaker Rui Costa. Finally, after a wage dispute with president João Vale e Azevedo, he was released from contract weeks before the UEFA Euro 2000 (making him the only free-agent in the competition), where he helped the national team reach the semi-finals after scoring eight goals during the qualifying stage: on 13 June 2000, he netted through a header against England for a 3–2 group stage win, after a two-goal disadvantage; he was also selected for Euro 1996.

After the end of the tournament Pinto had several offers from abroad, and after almost signing with Porto he settled for Sporting instead, agreeing to a four-year deal. After a relatively poor season in 2000–01, the Lions hired four-time Portuguese Golden Boot winner Mário Jardel, and Pinto returned to his golden years in a magnificent run which ended with the conquest of his second title; named the "father of the team" by the Brazilian, he played all but one game and scored nine goals.

Although a highly talented player, Pinto was also known for a series of red cards for aggression and bad tackles – his feud with Porto player and national teammate Paulinho Santos lasted for years, and both players would be frequently sent off after hitting each other. Other incidents that stirred some controversy included one case of aggression against a fireman during the half-time break and elbowing a C.F. Estrela da Amadora player during a practice match.

The lowest point, however, was when Pinto hit Argentine referee Ángel Sánchez (in the third group stage game, against South Korea, at the 2002 World Cup), who had sent him off after a bad tackle early in the match. He was suspended for six months.

Pinto ended his Portugal career with 81 caps, 23 goals, and appearances in Euro 1996, Euro 2000 and the 2002 World Cup. Never recovering fully from the incident at the latter tournament, he failed to impress in the following seasons, when Sporting failed to reach the top two spots, and in 2004 he was released from contract, returning to Boavista. Although he was close to signing with Al-Hilal FC of Saudi Arabia in the January transfer window, he remained with his first professional club.

After a second season carrying Boavista's squad (who almost qualified for UEFA Cup, with him scoring nine league goals and receiving numerous Player of the match awards), Pinto accepted the invitation of S.C. Braga's board in July 2006, signing for one year. He netted twice in 24 appearances in an eventual fourth-place finish for the Minho side, and extended his contract for the 2007–08 campaign; however, during February 2008, he trained with Toronto FC of Major League Soccer and, late into that month, announced the termination of his contract at Braga, retiring shortly after at nearly 37 years of age.

Subsequently, Pinto worked with the Portuguese Football Federation in directorial capacities.

Personal life

Still in his teens, Pinto had two children from his first marriage to Carla Baía. The elder, Tiago, first played professionally with C.D. Olivais e Moscavide; in 2008 he married television presenter Marisa Cruz, with the couple divorcing five years later.

Pinto's younger brother, Sérgio, was also a footballer, having played almost exclusively in the lower leagues of Portugal and one year in England.

Career statistics

Club

International
Scores and results list Portugal's goal tally first, score column indicates score after each Pinto goal.

Honours
Boavista
Taça de Portugal: 1991–92

Benfica
Primeira Liga: 1993–94
Taça de Portugal: 1992–93, 1995–96

Sporting
Primeira Liga: 2001–02
Taça de Portugal: 2001–02
Supertaça Cândido de Oliveira: 2000

Portugal
FIFA U-20 World Cup: 1989, 1991
UEFA European Under-21 Championship runner-up: 1994
UEFA European Under-18 Championship runner-up: 1988, 1990
UEFA European Under-16 Championship runner-up: 1988

Individual
CNID Footballer of the Year: 1992, 1993, 1994
Portuguese Golden Ball: 1993, 1996
SJPF Player of the Month: February 2006

See also
List of association football families

References

Further reading

External links

 
 
 
 
 

1971 births
Living people
Footballers from Porto
Portuguese footballers
Association football forwards
Primeira Liga players
Boavista F.C. players
S.L. Benfica footballers
Sporting CP footballers
S.C. Braga players
Segunda División players
Segunda División B players
Atlético Madrid B players
Portugal youth international footballers
Portugal under-21 international footballers
Portugal international footballers
UEFA Euro 1996 players
UEFA Euro 2000 players
2002 FIFA World Cup players
Portuguese expatriate footballers
Expatriate footballers in Spain
Portuguese expatriate sportspeople in Spain